The Cincinnati Reds are a Major League Baseball franchise based in Cincinnati who play in the National League's Central Division. In their history, the franchise also played under the names Cincinnati Red Stockings and Cincinnati Redlegs. They played in the American Association from 1882 through 1889, and have played in the National League since 1890. The first game of the new baseball season for a team is played on Opening Day, and being named the Opening Day starter is an honor that is often given to the player who is expected to lead the pitching staff that season, though there are various strategic reasons why a team's best pitcher might not start on Opening Day. The Reds have used 76 Opening Day starting pitchers since they began play as a Major League team in 1882.

The Reds have played in several different home ball parks. They played two seasons in their first home ball park, Bank Street Grounds, and had one win and one loss in Opening Day games there. The team had a record of six wins and ten losses in Opening Day games at League Park, and a record of three wins and seven losses in Opening Day games at the Palace of the Fans. The Reds played in Crosley Field from 1912 through the middle of the 1970 season, and had a record of 27 wins and 31 losses in Opening Day games there. They had an Opening Day record of 19 wins, 11 losses and 1 tie from 1971 through 2002 at Riverfront Stadium, and they have a record of three wins and six losses in Opening Day games at their current home ball park, the Great American Ball Park. That gives the Reds an overall Opening Day record of 59 wins, 66 losses and one tie at home. They have a record of three wins and one loss in Opening Day games on the road.

Mario Soto holds the Reds' record for most Opening Day starts, with six. Tony Mullane, Pete Donohue and Aaron Harang have each made five Opening Day starts for the Reds. José Rijo and Johnny Cueto have each made four Opening Day starts for Cincinnati, while Ewell Blackwell, Tom Browning, Paul Derringer, Art Fromme, Si Johnson, Gary Nolan, Jim O'Toole, Tom Seaver, Bucky Walters and Will White each made three such starts for the Reds. Harang was the Reds' Opening Day starting pitcher every season from 2006–2010. Among the Reds' Opening Day starting pitchers, Seaver and Eppa Rixey have been elected to the Baseball Hall of Fame.

The Reds have won the World Series championship five times, in 1919, 1940, 1975, 1976 and 1990. Dutch Ruether was the Reds' Opening Day starting pitcher in 1919, Derringer in 1940, Don Gullett in 1975, Nolan in 1976 and Browning in 1990. The Reds won all five Opening Day games in seasons in which they won the World Series. In addition, prior to the existence of the modern World Series, the Reds won the American Association championship in 1882. White was their Opening Day starting pitcher that season, the franchise's first. Jack Billingham started one of the most famous Opening Day games in Reds history on April 4, 1974 against the Atlanta Braves. In that game, Billingham surrendered Hank Aaron's 714th career home run, which tied Babe Ruth's all time home run record.

Key

Pitchers

References
General

Specific

Opening day starters
Lists of Major League Baseball Opening Day starting pitchers